Ali Jehangir Siddiqui (born 5 December 1976) is a Pakistani diplomat and entrepreneur. He has served as the Ambassador of Pakistan to the United States, as Special Assistant to the Prime Minister of Pakistan with the status of Minister of State and Pakistan's Ambassador for Foreign Investment in an honorary capacity. He has also served in various business and government advisory councils, policy institutions, and commercial entities.

Siddiqui founded JS Bank Limited in 2006 by acquiring American Express Bank's Pakistan operations. JS Bank currently has an asset base of over $4 billion, with a workforce of 5000 employees and presence in 180 cities of Pakistan.

Early life and background
Ali Jehangir Siddiqui was born to Jahangir Siddiqui, a Pakistani businessman, and Mahvash Jahangir Siddiqui, an educationist on 5 December 1976 in Karachi, Sindh. At the age of 15 he launched a technology business called Advance Micro Research which integrated computer network systems for corporations.

His father, Jahangir Siddiqui, founded Jahangir Siddiqui & Co. Ltd in 1970 which later became JS Group, an investment holding company with Rs. 413 billion (US$3.7 billion) in assets as of December 2017. The Group claims to employ more than 20,000 people in Pakistan and has invested in several companies in various sectors.

Siddiqui's mother Mahvash Siddiqui is an educationist by profession and has served as a Professor of English Literature and Head of the English Department at Khatoon-e-Pakistan College, Karachi.

Career

Entrepreneurship
Siddiqui has been notable in several business ventures, as a counsel and advisor throughout his career. This came from his work and investment with partners for setting up various businesses, including:

 Airblue
 Arabian Gulf Steel (a steel producer in the UAE)
 Jura Energy (a Canadian oil and gas company with operations in Pakistan)
 RAK Ghani Glass (the largest pharmaceutical glass producer in the UAE and GCC countries)
 JS Private Equity Management (founder and later Chief Investment Officer)

Board Memberships
Siddiqui has served as a Member of the Board for Global Access Health (GAH); a social enterprise which expands access to affordable medical technology such as diagnostic tests and manufacturing processes.

Siddiqui is on the Board of Governors of IPRI, a non-partisan think-tank on international relations, lawfare, strategic studies, governance, public policy, and economic security in Pakistan.

Government
 Board member of the Community Development Board (CDB) of the Government of Sindh
 Board member of the Private Sector Task Force of the Planning Commission of the Government of Pakistan
 Board member of the Board of Investment of the Government of Sindh
 Board member of the Privatization Commission of the Government of Pakistan
He had previously been a member on the boards of different government institutions.

Public service
Until he took up his government roles, Siddiqui was the CEO of the Mahvash & Jahangir Siddiqui Foundation (MJSF), which provides grants to the education, humanitarian relief, healthcare and social enterprise sectors in Pakistan. After the 2010 floods, MJSF established refugee camps accommodating more than 10,000 affected individuals, providing food supplies to over 20,000 people and clean water for over 100,000 people during the 4-month relief operations period. MJSF worked in coordination with the UN agencies and INGOs.

Apart from humanitarian services, Siddiqui is also known to support the arts.

He served on the board of Acumen, a global social enterprise investment firm, for 9 years.

Special Assistant to the Prime Minister
Soon after Shahid Khaqan Abbasi became Prime Minister of Pakistan, Siddiqui joined the Government and served as a Special Assistant to the Prime Minister with the status of a Minister of State from August 2017 until May 2018.

Ambassador to the US
In March 2018, he was appointed as the Ambassador of Pakistan to the United States and commenced his duties on 29 May 2018.

As Ambassador, he handled numerous regular engagements and meetings such as Congressional Outreach Programs, Think-tank meetings, Trade & Economy sittings, Embassy events, and Media as well as academia addressing.

Prior to his appointment as the Pakistani Ambassador to the United States, the National Accountability Bureau (NAB) claimed that Siddiqui was involved in matters relating to three companies: Azgard, Agritech, and Monte Bello which caused losses to investors and shareholders. Their claim was that he's the director of Azgard which siphoned moneys amounting to €23.758 million to purchase the company Monte Bello SRL using another company Fairytal SRL Sweden which resulted in loss for shareholders. He also sold shares under Azgard to government institutions at higher market rate in order to compensate for the company's loans. 

On the contrary, other reports suggested that the allegations from NAB were baseless. These allegations were politically driven because the Azgard and Agritech matters were already sub-judice prior to Siddiqui's appointment and Siddiqui was neither a party nor a respondent in these proceedings. Siddiqui had also left the board of directors of Montebellos parent company 4 years prior to its bankruptcy. The counterclaims, thus, indicated that the allegations in the investigation were an attempt to defame him and impede his appointment as ambassador. The court decided in favour of Siddiqui.

Siddiqui's reputation and work was acknowledged by US commentators while it was frequently criticized by Indian media.

In June 2018, Siddiqui presented his credentials to US President Donald Trump.

In July 2018, Siddiqui met James Mattis, the US Secretary of Defence. The meeting took place at the Pentagon where Siddiqui received a guard of honor on behalf of Pakistan.

During celebrations for Pakistan's 71st Anniversary of Independence in August 2018 at the Pakistani Embassy in Washington, Principal Deputy Assistant Secretary of State for South and Central Asian Affairs Ambassador Alice Wells, the chief guest at the event, acknowledged Pakistan's sacrifices against terrorism.

In October 2018, the Pakistani Foreign Minister Shah Mehmood Qureshi announced a change in Pakistan's ambassadorial appointments to multiple countries including the United States, Canada, Saudi Arabia, Qatar, Serbia, Cuba amongst others. The individuals being changed were appointed during the regime of Pakistan Muslim League-Nawaz (PML-N).

Speaking of Siddiqui’s role with regards to Pak-US relations at the launch of the Pak-Americana Report by Tabadlab on February 12, 2021, the Former Foreign Secretary of Pakistan, Salman Bashir, credited Ali Jehangir Siddiqui for overcoming obstacles and specifically making possible the Pakistan PM's visit to the White House.

Ambassador for Foreign Investment
On 13 June 2019, Ali Jehangir Siddiqui was appointed as the Ambassador for Foreign Investments in an Honorary Capacity.

Under his tenure due to the efforts of the PTI government in encouraging foreign and local investments in the country, Hutchison Port Holdings – Hong Kong-based port operator— committed on 15 October 2019 to invest US$240 million in Karachi Port in order to make it a major trading hub.

The Pakistani Prime Minister, Imran Khan, received the delegation of the group in October 2019, led by their Managing Director, Eric Ip.

World Economic Forum
Siddiqui was appointed to lead Pakistan Prime Ministers’ agendas at the World Economic Forum Annual Meetings in 2018 and 2020. In an interview, he summarized the delegation’s engagements at WEF 2020 under the key themes of economic partnership with Turkey, increased footprint among existing Japanese conglomerates, and Digital Pakistan.

In 2014, he was honored as a Young Global Leader by the World Economic Forum.

Multilateral engagement
As Special Assistant to the Prime Minister in 2017 and 2018, Siddiqui participated as a member of the Prime Ministers delegations to the Organization of Islamic Cooperation, Commonwealth Heads of Government Meetings, UN General Assembly, Shanghai Cooperation Organization's Council of Heads of Government Meetings and the World Economic Forum Annual Meetings.

He was tasked to lead the Prime Minister's agenda at the annual meeting of World Economic Forum 2020 held in January, at Davos.

Personal life
Siddiqui is married to Saira Siddiqui, a Montessori teacher by profession.

Academic
Siddiqui's early education consisted of:

 1995: Karachi Grammar School
 1999: BA Economics, Cornell University
 He has also pursued additional educational courses at MIT, the University of Cambridge and the University of Oxford.

Later, he lectured at various institutions, including:
 
 2012: College of William and Mary in Virginia.
 2013: National School of Public Policy in Lahore.
 2014: National Defence University in Islamabad.
 2018: Entrepreneurship and Management Excellence Center at Institute of Business Management in Karachi. 
 2018: School of Advanced International Studies at Johns Hopkins University in Washington DC
 2019: The University of Oxford

Awards and achievements
Siddiqui was listed by Pakistan's Federal Board of Revenue as amongst the top 100 individual taxpayers in Pakistan for the year 2013. He was chosen as a Young Global Leader by the World Economic Forum 2014.

Court cases
Siddiqui has earlier been called by the National Accountability Bureau (NAB) with respect to allegations that one of his companies, Azgard Nine Limited (ANL) had manipulated its stock price resulting in financial losses to investors. Despite passage of several years, no allegations have yet been proven and Ali Siddiqui has based his defence on the premise that he was neither a party nor a respondent to the cases which negates any connection with the same. After a period of 1.5 years, NAB dismissed the case due to inability to establish facts. All allegations were dropped and Siddiqui was cleared by the court of law.

References

External links
 
 
 

Living people
1976 births
Pakistani business executives
Ambassadors of Pakistan to the United States
Place of birth missing (living people)
Karachi Grammar School alumni
Cornell University alumni